Shahidul Alam Talukder is a Bangladesh Nationalist Party politician and the former Member of Parliament of Patuakhali-2.

Career
Talukder was elected to parliament from Patuakhali-2 as a Bangladesh Nationalist Party candidate in 2001. In 2005, cadres led by him assaulted Monjur Morshed, correspondent of the Daily Jugantor, for reporting on the theft of Hilsa by Bangladesh Nationalist Party men. Most of the journalist in Bauphal Upazila had to flew their homes after facing intimidation from Bangladesh Police and Bangladesh Nationalist Party men. In 2006, he beat up a student of Baufal Degree College, a college owned by him, for refusing to pay an extra fee for examination.

Talukder was sentenced to nine years in jail for hiding information in his wealth statement on a case filled by Anti-Corruption Commission.

References

Bangladesh Nationalist Party politicians
Living people
8th Jatiya Sangsad members
Year of birth missing (living people)